The 2015 Wyoming Cowboys football team represented the University of Wyoming during the 2015 NCAA Division I FBS football season. The Cowboys were led by second year head coach Craig Bohl and played their home games at War Memorial Stadium. They were members of the Mountain Division of the Mountain West Conference. They finished the 2–10, 2–6 in Mountain West play to finish in last place in the Mountain Division.

Schedule

Schedule Source:

Personnel

Coaching staff

Roster

Box Scores

North Dakota

Eastern Michigan

at Washington State

New Mexico

at Appalachian State

at Air Force

Nevada

at Boise State

at Utah State

Colorado State

at San Diego State

UNLV

Statistics
source:

Team

Offense

Defense

Key: SOLO: Solo Tackles, AST: Assisted Tackles, TOT: Total Tackles, TFL: Tackles-for-loss, SACK: Quarterback Sacks, INT: Interceptions, BU: Passes Broken Up, QBH: Quarterback Hits, FF: Forced Fumbles, FR: Fumbles Recovered, BLK: Kicks or Punts Blocked, SAF: Safeties

Special teams

Scores by quarter (all opponents)

References

Wyoming
Wyoming Cowboys football seasons
Wyoming Cowboys football